The 2007 Arena Football League season was the 21st season of the Arena Football League.  The regular season began play on March 1, 2007 and concluded on June 25. The league broke its regular-season total attendance record of 1,887,054.

Following a year-long hiatus last year in the aftermath of Hurricane Katrina, the New Orleans VooDoo franchise resumed play this season to return the league to a 19-team format.  New Orleans also hosted ArenaBowl XXI. This was the last of three non-consecutive AFL seasons in which the league fielded 19 teams, the most in AFL history. 

The league champions were the San Jose SaberCats, who defeated the Columbus Destroyers in ArenaBowl XXI.

Final standings

 Green indicates clinched playoff berth
 Purple indicates division champion
 Grey indicates division champion and conference's best record

Source: ArenaFan.com

Playoffs

Statistics

Quarterback

Running backs

*McPherson is a Quarterback, he was on the rushing yards list at arenafootball.com

Wide receivers

Touchdowns

Defense

Special teams

Kick return

Kicking

*Set AFL record for tackles by a Kicker with 15.5.

Awards

Individual season awards

All-Arena team

Notes

External links
 
 2007 AFL All-Arena Team Roster
 2007 AFL All-Ironman Team Roster